Jean-François Parot (27 June 1946 – 23 May 2018) was a French diplomat and writer of historical mysteries, born in Paris.

Background and professional career
Coming from a family closely connected with the cinema (as a child, he knew Jean Gabin, his mother worked for Marcel Carné and his grandfather was editor of Abel Gance's Napoléon), Parot has a BA and an MA in history and completed postgraduate studies in anthropology, specializing in Egyptian mummification techniques, the myths of the Pacific Islanders, and the social history of eighteenth century Paris. He is the author of a study Structures sociales des quartiers de Grève, Saint-Avoye et Saint-Antoine, 1780–1785 (published on microfiche by Hachette, 1974).

Following his military service, working in Saint-Louis, Senegal, Parot was launched into diplomacy "by chance" on the advice of the consul general to whom he had been assigned. He was vice-consul in Kinshasa (1974); Consul General of France in Ho Chi Minh City (1982–87) and in Athens; embassy counselor in Doha, Khartoum, Djibouti, Ouagadougou and Sofia; Minister Counselor at Tunis and deputy to the French ambassador; also advisor to the Minister of Industry and deputy director of personnel in the Ministry of Foreign Affairs in Nantes. Between 2002 and 2006 he was deputy director of the Directorate of Military Cooperation and Defense. He became Ambassador in Guinea-Bissau in October 2006. As ambassador, he emphasised the role of food in diplomacy.

Writing
Parot is best known as the author of the Nicolas Le Floch crime series. Parot conceived the idea of his eighteenth-century police Commissaire when stationed in Sofia. The characteristic feature of his novels is the accuracy of the historical Parisian background blended with action and mystery.

His books are published by Éditions Jean-Claude Lattès in Paris and in the Grands détectives series by Éditions 10/18. Most have also been published by Éditions France loisirs and le Grand livre du mois. His works have been translated into Italian, Spanish, English, Japanese and Russian. They are the subject of a television adaptation on France 2 by former police inspector Hugues Pagan with Jérôme Robart in the title rôle.

Fictional character
Nicolas Le Floch was born in Guérande, Brittany, the illegitimate son of the Marquis de Ranreuil, raised by Canon Le Floch. When the cycle of novels begins in 1761, he is working with the (real-life) Antoine de Sartine, Lieutenant General of Police of Paris, and promoted to Commissaire of le Châtelet. Assisted by Inspector Pierre Bourdeau and others he goes on to solve crimes as well as pursue a complicated love life. He and many of his friends are gourmets and descriptions of food feature prominently in the novels.

Works
Les enquêtes de Nicolas Le Floch, commissaire au Châtelet (Listed here are the first French editions (Éd. J.-C. Lattès, Paris) and the first English editions (Gallic Books, London)

L'Énigme des Blancs-Manteaux, 2000, . – The Châtelet Apprentice, 2007, .
L'Homme au ventre de plomb, 2000, . – The Man with the Lead Stomach, 2008, .
Le Fantôme de la rue Royale, 2001, . – The Phantom of the Rue Royale, 2008, .
L'Affaire Nicolas Le Floch, 2002, . – The Nicolas Le Floch Affair, 2009, .
Le Crime de l'hôtel Saint-Florentin, 2004, . – The Saint-Florentin Murders, 2010, .
Le Sang des farines, 2005, . – The Baker's Blood, 2012, .
Le Cadavre anglais, 2007, .
Le Noyé du grand canal, 2009, .
L'Honneur de Sartine, 2010, .
L'Enquête russe, 2012, .
L'Année du volcan, 2013, .
La Pyramide de glace, 2014, .
L'Inconnu du pont Notre-Dame, 2015, .
Le Prince de Cochinchine, 2017 .

References

External links 
 Official site

1946 births
2018 deaths
Lycée Henri-IV alumni
Writers from Paris
French crime fiction writers
French diplomats
French male novelists
Writers of historical mysteries